AHSA2 also known as AHA1, activator of heat shock 90kDa protein ATPase homolog 2 (yeast) is a human gene which encodes a protein which acts as co-chaperone of Hsp90 (heat shock protein 90).  AHSA2 and the related AHSA1 belongs to the AHA (Activator of Hsp90 ATPase) family of  stress-regulated proteins that bind directly to Hsp90 and are required for Hsp90-dependent activation of client proteins.

References

Co-chaperones